Previews are a set of public performances of a theatrical presentation that precede its official opening. The purpose of previews is to allow the director and crew to identify problems and opportunities for improvement that were not found during rehearsals and to make adjustments before critics are invited to attend. The duration of the preview period varies, and ticket prices may be reduced.

The term can also be used to describe an exhibition of a film to evaluate an audience's reaction and make possible changes before its official release. (This is different from a "trailer", a short advertisement for a finished film.)

References

Stage terminology
Types of polling

de:Vorschau